Wolterstorff's gecko (Urocotyledon wolterstorffi) is a species of lizard in the family Gekkonidae. The species is endemic to Tanzania.

Etymology
The specific name, wolterstorffi, is in honor of German herpetologist Willy Wolterstorff.

Geographic range
U. wolterstorffi is found in the Uluguru Mountains and the Usambara Mountains of Tanzania.

Reproduction
U. wolterstorffi is oviparous.

References

Further reading
Broadley DG, Howell KM (1991). "A Check List of the Reptiles of Tanzania, with Synoptic Keys". Syntarsus 1: 1-70. (Urocotyledon wolterstorffi, p. 10).
Kluge AG (1983). "Cladistic Relationships among Gekkonid Lizards". Copeia 1983 (2): 465–475. (Urocotyledon wolterstorffi, new combination).
Rösler H (2000). "Kommentierte Liste der rezent, subrezent und fossil bekannten Geckotaxa (Reptilia: Gekkonomorpha)". Gekkota 2: 28–153. (Urocotyledon wolterstorffi, p. 119). (in German).
Spawls, Stephen; Howell, Kim; Hinkel, Harald; Menegon, Michele (2018). A Field Guide to East African Reptiles, Second Edition. London and New York: Bloomsbury. 624 pp. . (Urocotyledon wolterstorffi, p. 124).
Tornier G (1900). "Neue Liste der Crocodile, Schildkröten und Eidechsen Deutsch Ost-Afrikas ". Zoologische Jahrbücher, Abtheilung für Systematik, Geographie und Biologie der Thiere, Jena 13: 579–618. (Diplodactylus wolterstorffi, new species, pp. 584–586, Figure A). (in German).

Urocotyledon
Geckos of Africa
Reptiles of Tanzania
Endemic fauna of Tanzania
Taxa named by Gustav Tornier
Reptiles described in 1900